There are many types of contraceptive methods available in France. All contraceptives are obtained by medical prescription after a visit to the family planning, a gynecologist or a midwife. With the exception of emergency contraception that does not require a prescription and can be obtained directly in a pharmacy.

History and important dates 
The legalization of birth control occurred in France in 1967, when the Neuwirth Law lifted the ban on birth control methods on December 28, 1967, including oral contraception. It
legalized the free prescription of the contraceptive pill. 

In 1973, the Movement for the Freedom of Abortion and Contraception (MLAC) was created. From 1974 onwards, the pill has been reimbursed by the social security system in France.

In 1999, the morning-after pill (or emergency contraception pill) was available in pharmacies without prescription. Two years later in 2001, the Aubry law on abortion in France and contraception was adopted. The statutory period for abortion is fixed to 12 weeks and not only 10. Minors can be accompanied by an adult of their choice to obtain an abortion.

In 2022 France began to introduce free birth control to women between the ages of 18 and 25 years in order to reduce the number of unwanted pregnancies in the age group. The French government will provide access to birth control pills, intrauterine devices, contraceptive patches and injectable birth control.

Laws and policies 
In France, a prescription is required to obtain hormonal birth control.

 December 2015 : The Health Act law by Marisol Tourraine introduced a 'no questions asked' policy regarding contraceptives and stated emergency contraceptives may be administered by school nurses.
 On Friday, October 26, 2012, the National Assembly adopted two amendments to the Social Security Financing Bill for 2013 almost unanimously. This bill extends free contraception to all minors aged 15 to 18. The goal of putting greater free access to contraception in place is to reduce the number of unwanted pregnancies, and thus the number of abortions, in France.
 : Young girls will unconditionally be able to obtain morning after pills in secondary school infirmaries without parental consent or notification.

Different means of contraception in France 
In France, there are various means of contraception.

The pill is the most well-known and the most used means of contraception in France. There are different pills. A visit to a gynecologist is required for a prescription and to see which type of pill is most suitable. While it is the most used mean of contraception, it is important to note that, in France, fewer women are using the pill. This is due to the debate related to the risks of 3rd and 4th generation pills, and also to the development of alternative and less restrictive means of birth control.

The contraceptive implant is a small stick put in place under the skin. The implant contains the same hormones as contraceptive pills. These hormones are diffused directly into the blood and suppress ovulation. The advantages are that it is easy to put in place, efficient and discreet. It is possible to keep the same implant for three years. In France, contraceptive implants have been available since 2001. The implant can be bought in pharmacies, costs €106.76 and is reimbursed up to 65% by Social Security. The implant, its insertion and removal are free for women under 18 years old in the planning centers of public hospitals.

The patch can be used for four consecutive weeks and should be applied on the stomach, on the shoulders or in the lower back. It should never be applied near a breast. A box of patches can be bought in pharmacies with prescription, costs around €15 but is not reimbursed by the Social Security.

Condoms are also used in France. There are two kinds of condoms: male and female. It is easy to find male condoms in France in pharmacies, convenience stores, café/tobacco shops, or vending machines.

Spermicides are substances in the form of gel or capsules inserted in the vagina, which inactivate or destroy the spermatozoa. In France, spermicides are available without prescription but they are not reimbursed by Social Security.

There are also intrauterine devices (IUD): There are copper IUD or hormonal IUD. The insertion of an IUD is done by a gynecologist or a midwife. The intrauterine Device (IUD) must first be prescribed by a doctor or midwife. The price depends on the type of IUD: for the copper IUD, it is around €30 and for the hormonal IUD, it costs €125,15. Both are reimbursed up to 65% by Social Security.

Injectable progestin is a synthetic progestin (medroxyprogesterone) injected intramuscularly every three months. It is effective for 12 weeks. Each dose costs €3,44 and it is reimbursed up to 65% by Social Security.

Diaphragms are generally made of latex or silicone. They slide into the vagina, in contact with the cervix, to prevent the passage of sperm to the inside of the uterus. They can be inserted in advance and are reusable.

The vaginal ring is a flexible porous plastic ring that contains a combination of estrogen and progestin. The advantage compared to the pill is that it does not need to be remembered daily. It costs €16 and is available in pharmacies with prescription, but it is not reimbursed by Social Security.

Sterilization can be a female (tubal ligation) or a male sterilization (vasectomy). It is definitive. The intervention can be only operated after a reflection period of four months after the first consultation.

Natural methods are another mean of contraception, without hormones: Ogino method, temperature method, Billings method, withdrawal. Natural methods are free but they can be imprecise and not always reliable.

There are also two kinds of emergency contraception. The morning after pill must be taken within 72 hours of unprotected sex and is available in pharmacies. The intrauterine device (IUD) may also be used as an emergency contraception up to five days after unprotected intercourse to prevent pregnancy.

See also
Abortion in France

References